The 2018 South Carolina Gamecocks football team (variously USC, SC, South Carolina, or The Gamecocks) represents the University of South Carolina in the 2018 NCAA Division I FBS football season. This season marks the Gamecocks 125th overall season, 27th as a member of the SEC, and 3rd under head coach Will Muschamp. The Gamecocks play their home games at Williams–Brice Stadium in Columbia, South Carolina.

Background

Previous season 

South Carolina started out the 2017 season with a win over NC State in the Belk Kickoff Game 35–28. They then followed it up with a road win against Missouri 31–13. In the following game vs Kentucky, star wide receiver Deebo Samuel broke his right fibula, and would miss the remainder of the season. After close losses to Texas A&M and Kentucky, South Carolina defeated 3 SEC schools in a row; Arkansas, Tennessee, and Vanderbilt. After a hard-fought 24–10 loss to rivals #1 Georgia on the road, South Carolina defeated Florida 28–20 finishing 5–3 in SEC play good enough for 2nd in the SEC East. South Carolina recorded their fifth 9-win season in the last 8 years, going 9–4, 5–3 in the SEC. The Gamecocks finished in the top 2 in the SEC East for the 4th time in 8 years, and won their fifth bowl game in 7 years defeating Michigan 26–19 in the Outback Bowl.

Offseason departures

Preseason

Returning starters
South Carolina will have sixteen returning players on offense, nine on defense and two on special teams that started games in 2017.

Offense

Defense

Special teams

Award watch lists
Listed in the order that they were released

SEC media poll
The SEC media poll was released on July 20, 2018, with the Gamecocks predicted to finish in second place in the East Division.

Preseason All-SEC teams
The Gamecocks had three players at five positions selected to the preseason all-SEC teams.

Offense

1st team

Deebo Samuel – WR

3rd team

Zack Bailey – OL

Specialists

1st team

Deebo Samuel – RET

Deebo Samuel – all purpose player

2nd team

Joseph Charlton – P

Recruiting

Position key

2018 recruiting class

Incoming transfers
South Carolina added two grad transfers, and two regular transfers to the 2018 roster.

Schedule

Spring game

The 2018 South Carolina Gamecocks Garnet and Black spring game took place in Columbia, South Carolina on March 31, at 12:00 p.m. EST. The game was broadcast live on the SEC Network. The Black team defeated the Garnet team by a score of 34–20, QB Jake Bentley completed 15 of 25 passes for 174 yards and 2 TD's.

Regular season
South Carolina announced its 2018 football schedule on September 19, 2017. The schedule consists of 7 home games and 5 away games for the regular season. The Gamecocks hosted SEC opponents Georgia (rivalry) on September 8, Missouri on October 6, Texas A&M on October 13, and Tennessee, on October 27. South Carolina traveled to four SEC opponents: Vanderbilt, Kentucky, Ole Miss and Florida.

South Carolina's out of conference opponents represent the ACC, MAC, SoCon and Sun Belt conferences. The Gamecocks hosted three non–conference games which are against Coastal Carolina of the Sun Belt, Akron of the MAC and Chattanooga of the SoCon. South Carolina traveled to archrival Clemson of the ACC for 116th annual Palmetto Bowl to finish the regular season.  The Gamecocks were originally scheduled to face Conference USA opponent Marshall on September 15, but this game was cancelled due to Hurricane Florence.  Akron was then scheduled as a replacement.

Personnel

Coaching staff
South Carolina head coach Will Muschamp will enter his third-year in 2018. Muschamp has led the Gamecocks to 15 wins and 11 losses over his first two years, tying Steve Spurrier, and Joe Morrison for most wins in the first two seasons as a Gamecock head coach. On December 6, Offensive Coordinator Kurt Roper was terminated after offensive struggles. Co-offensive coordinator/wide receivers coach Bryan McClendon served as the offensive coordinator for the Outback Bowl win against Michigan, and was promoted to permanent offensive coordinator to replace Roper. On January 5, Dan Werner accepted the role of quarterbacks coach. Werner has previously been on Ole Miss, Miami, and Alabama's coaching staff.

On January 11, it was announced that former South Carolina star running back Marcus Lattimore would be joining the staff as the director of player development.

Roster

Depth chart

Game summaries

Coastal Carolina

vs No. 3 Georgia

at Vanderbilt

at Kentucky

Missouri

Texas A&M

Tennessee

at Ole Miss

at Florida

Chattanooga

at Clemson

Akron

vs. Virginia (Belk Bowl)

Rankings

Players drafted into the NFL

References

South Carolina
South Carolina Gamecocks football seasons
South Carolina Gamecocks football